The Clark Street station is a station on the IRT Broadway–Seventh Avenue Line of the New York City Subway. It is located at Clark Street and Henry Street in Brooklyn Heights, Brooklyn. It is served by the 2 train at all times and the 3 train at all times except late nights.

History

20th century
On April 15, 1919, the Clark Street Tunnel opened, and this station opened with it, extending West Side Line express trains from Wall Street on the other side of the East River to Atlantic Avenue via a new connection at Borough Hall. The connection doubled the capacity between Manhattan and Brooklyn and eased congestion from the Joralemon Street Tunnel. Direct express service to Times Square was provided to the inhabitants of Brooklyn for the first time as a result.

On April 30, 1930, the New York State Transit Commission ordered the installation of a third elevator at the station. This elevator went into service on November 25, 1931.

The city government took over the IRT's operations on June 12, 1940.

In 1981, the Metropolitan Transportation Authority (MTA) listed the station among the 69 most deteriorated stations in the subway system. On February 8, 1983, renovations made to the station as part of the MTA's Adopt-A-Station Program were unveiled. The $260,000 cost was evenly split between public and private agencies. Neighborhood maps were added to the station as part of the project.

In 1984–1985, construction was completed to rehabilitate the station. The station was chosen for renovation in 1979, and design work was done in early 1982. Artwork was to be contributed to the design. The platform was refinished, new lights and new signs were installed, and new painting was done. The project was projected to cost $1.25 million but went over budget. The construction was projected to begin in January 1984, but it quickly fell behind schedule. Issues with the contractors contributed to the delays.

21st century
The elevators were repaired in 2000, necessitating a four-month closure, and again in 2007. In January 2017, Clark Street became the last underground station in the New York City Subway to receive Transit Wireless cell phone service.

The MTA announced in 2019 that the station's elevators would need to be replaced again in 2020 because they frequently broke down. At the time, the MTA estimated that repairs might take eight months to three years depending on whether the station is fully closed or remains open. The elevators have never been replaced since they were originally installed: two of the elevators date from the station's opening in 1919, while the third dates from 1931. In September 2021, the MTA announced that the station would again be closed for several months for elevator replacement and structural repairs. The station was closed on November 3, 2021, and reopened on May 5, 2022.

Station layout 

Clark Street is geographically the westernmost station in Brooklyn on the Broadway–Seventh Avenue Line. It has one island platform and two tracks. Due to the deep-bore tunneling used to construct this part of the line, the station's walls are rounded. On the walls of the platforms are mosaics of sailing ships and large name panels reading Clark Street–Brooklyn Heights.

Exit 
The platform has two staircases in the center that go up to a passageway, which leads to three elevators. The floor of the passageway contains a 1987 artwork titled Clark Street Passage by Ray Ring and the elevators go up to fare control, which is on the first floor of the now-defunct Hotel St. George.

The station is not fully ADA-accessible, since there are no elevators or ramps that lead to the platform. The fare control area contains a small arcade of businesses and two doors that led to the former lobby and checking room of the hotel. The station's two entrances have awnings that read "Hotel St. George."

This is one of only three stations in the subway system that can be accessed solely by elevators. The other two—168th Street and 181st Street—are also on the Broadway–Seventh Avenue Line, albeit in Upper Manhattan.  An emergency stairwell exists between elevators 1 and 2 from the passageway up to fare control, but it is rarely used and consists of an 80-foot (24.3-meter) climb.

A 2008 study by Brooklyn Community Board 6 examined the possibility of creating a new entrance to the station from Brooklyn Bridge Park; however, it was deemed economically unfeasible.

References

Further reading

External links 

 

IRT Broadway–Seventh Avenue Line stations
New York City Subway stations in Brooklyn
Railway stations in the United States opened in 1919
Brooklyn Heights